IC 1590 is an open cluster located in the nebulosity of NGC 281. 279 stars with magnitudes less than or equal to 17 are visible within or near the cluster. The cluster is estimated to be 3.5 million years old, making it relatively young compared to other star systems. Inside the cluster is a multiple-star system that emits light which helps give the dust in NGC 281 its glow.

Gallery

See also
Cassiopeia
NGC 281

References

Open clusters